Jose Manuel Tadeo "Chel" Icasiano Diokno (born February 23, 1961) is a Filipino lawyer, educator, and human rights advocate. He serves as chairman of the Free Legal Assistance Group (FLAG), the founding dean of the De La Salle University College of Law (now Tañada-Diokno School of Law), and the chairman of the Bantayog ng mga Bayani Foundation. He has served as a special counsel of the Senate Blue Ribbon Committee.

Early life and education

Diokno was born on February 23, 1961, in Pasay City as the eighth of the ten children of human rights lawyer Jose W. Diokno, who would later become Senator, and Carmen "Nena" Icasiano. He is the great-grandson of Ananías Diokno, the leader of the Visayans during the Philippine–American War, and the grandson of Ramón Diokno, a nationalist who served as Senator and Supreme Court Associate Justice.

Diokno completed his elementary and secondary education at La Salle Green Hills. He was student council leader and was a member of the varsity basketball team and developed an interest in cycling and aikido, earning a black belt in the martial art. Afterwards, in 1982, he earned a Bachelor of Arts degree in Philosophy at the University of the Philippines Diliman, studied Bachelor of Laws at the University of the Philippines College of Law for a year until 1983 and then studied law at Northern Illinois University (NIU) in the United States, where he graduated Juris Doctor, magna cum laude, in 1986. He passed the Bar of the State of Illinois in 1987, and after his father's death went back to the Philippines where he took the Bar Examinations of 1988. He passed the examinations and started his law practice the following year.

Legal career

Diokno passed the bar examination in the State of Illinois and then in the Philippines. Upon his return to the Philippines in 1987, he served as a lawyer and a human rights advocate. Diokno is a member and the current chairman of FLAG. Other than handling landmark cases, he has also been a regular amicus curiae in the Supreme Court.

Notable cases
 Diokno was part of the team of FLAG lawyers who prosecuted the 27 police officers implicated in the 1995 Kuratong Baleleng rubout case.
 NBN–ZTE deal corruption scandal: He is the counsel of Jun Lozada, whistleblower and lead witness in the Ombudsman's cases against former National Economic and Development Authority (NEDA) head Romulo Neri and former Commission on Elections (Comelec) chair Benjamin Abalos.
 In 2007, he along with fellow FLAG lawyers Theodore O. Te and Ricardo A. Sunga III, petitioned and were granted by the Supreme Court to issue Writs of Amparo for Raymond and Reynaldo Manalo, two brothers who were allegedly tortured by agents of the military.
 In 2008, he won the release of the "Tagaytay 5," who were allegedly illegally detained by the Philippine National Police.
 Together with Te, Diokno represented some media organizations in a petition against the Arroyo administration. The case brought together members of ABS-CBN, the Philippine Daily Inquirer, Probe Productions, Newsbreak, and the Philippine Center for Investigative Journalism, among others for allegedly being rounded up for their "illegal" coverage of the Manila Peninsula siege.
 Diokno served as the main lawyer, together with Te, for Maria Ressa of Rappler against the Duterte administration. One of the cases he handled for Ressa was in People of the Philippines v. Santos, Ressa and Rappler.

Government service

In the 1990s, Diokno served in the Commission on Human Rights under Presidents Cory Aquino and Fidel V. Ramos. He was also a member of the Committee on Human Rights and Due Process at the Integrated Bar of the Philippines (IBP).

In 2001, Diokno was the private prosecutor in the impeachment proceedings against then-President Joseph Estrada. That same year, he became General Counsel of the Senate Blue Ribbon Committee (the Committee on Accountability of Public Officers and Investigation) under Senator Joker Arroyo. In 2004, he was appointed Special Counsel at the Development Bank of the Philippines.

Until 2019, Diokno served as the Presidential Adviser on Human Rights at the Integrated Bar of the Philippines and was a member of the Panel of Arbitrators at the International Centre for Settlement of Investment Disputes.

Academe
In 2006, Diokno set up the Diokno Law Center providing legal training to agencies such as the Comelec, the Public Attorney's Office or PAO, the Philippine National Police, the Office of the Ombudsman, the Bureau of Internal Revenue, the Bureau of Customs, and the IBP.

In 2009, he established the De La Salle University College of Law and became its founding dean. Diokno currently teaches Environmental law and Political law at the renamed DLSU Tañada-Diokno School of Law. He also taught at Far Eastern University when it collaborated with DLSU's MBA program and at Ateneo de Manila University, where his father also taught but in trial practice.

Political career

In the Philippine general election of 2019, Diokno launched a campaign for a seat in the Senate under Otso Diretso, a coalition that was against the purported human rights violations of President Rodrigo Duterte; he lost, placing 21st with 6,308,065 votes.

On July 19, 2019, the PNP–Criminal Investigation and Detection Group (CIDG) filed charges against Diokno and other members of the opposition for "sedition, cyber libel, libel, estafa, harboring a criminal, and obstruction of justice". On February 10, 2020, he was cleared of all charges.

On June 12, 2021, he was named among the six nominees of 1Sambayan, a coalition that will put up one lone candidate against President Duterte's handpicked successor in the 2022 Philippine presidential election, for president and vice president. Fellow Otso Diretso senatorial candidate Samira Gutoc earlier said in 2019 that he can be an opposition standard bearer. However, he said that he was very honored by the nomination, although he never aspired for those positions as he is focused on his Free Legal Helpdesk, and hopes to serve the country, especially the youth and the ordinary Filipino, in justice, accountability, and relief from the pandemic.

On September 15, 2021, he announced that he would be running again for senator in 2022. He filed his candidacy on October 7 as a new member of the Katipunan ng Nagkakaisang Pilipino (KANP) party. He was among those named in the senatorial slate of presidential aspirant and Vice President Leni Robredo, as well as the Labor and Ecology Advocates for Democracy (LEAD) senatorial slate of another presidential aspirant Leody de Guzman as a guest candidate. However, he was defeated once again, placing 19th with 10,020,008 votes.

Political positions

Human rights
He advocated human rights in his law practice with the Free Legal Assistance Group, as counsel to the Senate Blue Ribbon Committee, and in his role as the founding Dean of the De La Salle University Tañada-Diokno School of Law.

Martial law under Ferdinand Marcos
As the descendant of former Senator and Martial Law critic Jose W. Diokno, Chel Diokno has taken a stand against the historical negationism and denialism regarding the Philippines' Martial Law era under Ferdinand Marcos.

Authored books 
Diokno has written three books: Diokno On Trial: The Techniques And Ideals Of The Filipino Lawyer (The Complete Guide To Handling A Case In Court), published by the Diokno Law Center in 2007 and considered the main staple in trial courses;  Civil And Administrative Suits As Instruments Of  Accountability For Human Rights Violations, published by the Asia Foundation in 2010, and "Model Pleadings of Jose W. Diokno Volume 1: Supreme Court" published by the Diokno Law Center in 2020. He has also written news articles on forensic DNA, electronic evidence, anti-terrorism legislation, media law, and judicial reform.

Filmography
Diokno did a voiceover for some scenes of the 2018 film BuyBust.

Personal life 

Diokno is the son of Filipino nationalist Senator Jose W. "Ka Pepe" Diokno, the acknowledged father of human rights in the Philippines and intellectual leader against the Marcos regime. His sister, Maris Diokno, is a senior administrator in the University of the Philippines system and is a former chair of the National Historical Commission of the Philippines. Diokno married a writer named Divina Aromin; their eldest son is the filmmaker Pepe, who was named after his grandfather. His eldest daughter Laya Elena is also a lawyer.

Ancestral tree

See also 
 Free Legal Assistance Group
 Sen. Jose W. Diokno
 Pepe Diokno (director)
 Maris Diokno
 Ananías Diokno
 Ramón Diokno
 Diokno family

References

External links
 Chel Diokno official website
 Chel Diokno campaign website

1961 births
Corazon Aquino administration personnel
Academic staff of De La Salle University
Diokno family
20th-century Filipino lawyers
Tagalog people
Filipino YouTubers
Liberal Party (Philippines) politicians
Living people
Northern Illinois University alumni
People from Batangas
Filipino people of American descent
Ramos administration personnel
University of the Philippines Diliman alumni
21st-century Filipino lawyers